Accuracy classes are defined and used in IEC and ANSI standards.  Classes are denoted by either a letter or percentage.  For example, Class B is a temperature accuracy from IEC-751 that requires accuracy of ± 0.15 degrees Celsius. Class 0.5 is an ANSI C12.20 accuracy class for electric meters with absolute accuracy better than ± 0.5% of the nominal full scale reading.

Typically, a class specifies accuracy at a number of points, with the absolute accuracy at lower values being better than the nominal "percentage of full scale" accuracy.

Accuracy classes such as IEC's 0.15s are a 'special' high accuracy class.

 Calculation for accuracy of class 1 meter:
 1600 impulse/KWh and 
 considering, P.F= 1 and LOAD = 100w
 Revolution time, 
 Rt = (3600×Kh×1)/Load(w) [Kh = 1000/(impulse/Kwh=1600)]
 Rt = (3600×0.625×1)/100
 Rt = 22.5sec [Standard]

 %of error = (Ft-Rt)/Rt

The positive or negative result indicates whether the meter is fast or slow. If the result is positive then the meter is fast, while negative means the meter is slow.

Measurement